Joseph Areruya (born 1 January 1996) is a Rwandan cyclist, who most recently rode for French amateur team Pédale Pilotine–Blue Car. In 2017 he won the Tour du Rwanda. He became the first cyclist from Rwanda to ride in the Paris–Roubaix road race, when he took part in the 2019 edition.

Major results
Source: 

2013
 9th Road race, National Road Championships
2014
 7th Time trial, National Road Championships
2015
 National Road Championships
2nd Road race
3rd Time trial
3rd Under-23 time trial
 2nd Overall Tour du Rwanda
 5th Overall Tour de Côte d'Ivoire
 7th Road race, African Games
2016
 1st Circuit de Constantine
 2nd Overall Tour de Blida
1st  Young rider classification
 2nd Road race, National Road Championships
 2nd GP de la Ville d'Oran
 4th Overall Tour du Rwanda
1st Stage 4
 6th Overall Tour International de Sétif
 6th Circuit d'Alger
 8th Overall Tour de Constantine
 9th Time trial, African Road Championships
2017
 1st  Overall Tour du Rwanda
1st Stages 1 & 3
 1st Stage 5a Giro Ciclistico d'Italia
 African Road Championships
3rd  Team time trial
6th Road race
7th Time trial
2018
 1st  Time trial, National Road Championships
 1st  Overall La Tropicale Amissa Bongo
1st  Young rider classification
1st Stage 4
 1st  Overall Coupe des Nations de l'Espoir Blue Line
1st  Points classification
 African Road Championships
2nd  Team time trial
3rd  Time trial
6th Road race
2019
 1st  Time trial, National Road Championships
 African Games
3rd  Team time trial
7th Time trial
 9th Overall Tour du Rwanda
2021
 African Road Championships
2nd  Team time trial
7th Road race
2022
 1st Stage 1 Tour de Martinique

References

External links
 
 
 

1996 births
Living people
Rwandan male cyclists
African Games bronze medalists for Rwanda
African Games medalists in cycling
Commonwealth Games competitors for Rwanda
Cyclists at the 2018 Commonwealth Games
Competitors at the 2015 African Games
Competitors at the 2019 African Games